Mount Pleasant is a borough in Westmoreland County, Pennsylvania, United States. It stands 45 miles (72 km) southeast of Pittsburgh. As of the 2020 census, the borough's population was 4,245.

The Borough of Mount Pleasant, consisting of the town area, should not be confused with Mount Pleasant Township, which is an entirely separate municipality. Mount Pleasant Township is predominantly rural and adjoins the borough to the north.

In the past, Mount Pleasant was a center of an extensive coke-making industry. Other products included flour, lumber, iron, glass, foundry products, etc.

History
The year of Mount Pleasant's first non-Indian resident is not known, although one source states that at the time of the American Revolutionary War, there was a settlement of "not more than a half dozen houses."  Braddock Road (Braddock expedition) passed through the western end of the future town in 1755, opening the area to settlement. In 1793 Michael Smith was licensed to operate an inn, which would have served traffic on Glades Road (sometimes spelled Glade Road), now Route 31. In 1797, Nathaniel Marshall sold land to Andrew McCready, who laid out the design of the town.

Jacob's Creek Bridge, the first iron-chain suspension bridge built in the United States, was erected south of the town in 1801. It was demolished in 1833.

Unfortunately, no pre-1800 structures remain within the borough limits. The borough's three oldest existing buildings all date from approximately 1812: The Shupe House at 201 Main Street, Hitchman House at 355 Main Street, and the Rupert Building at 642-644 Main Street.

Mount Pleasant became a borough on February 7, 1828.

Glass manufacturing was a foundation of the local economy, with Bryce Brothers commencing operations in 1850, and L. E. Smith Glass in 1907.  The invention of the Bessemer process of steelmaking in 1859, which required coke (fuel), had a dramatic impact on the region. The town prospered as coal deposits were developed, from which coke was made. However, the lives of coal miners in the outlying "patch towns" (company-owned mining towns) were arduous, and labor-management disputes became frequent. The strike in Morewood, west of Mount Pleasant borough, was the most violent of the area's strikes, in which nine miners were killed by sheriff's deputies on April 3, 1891.

Mount Pleasant was disadvantaged when the main lines of the railroads bypassed the community in the 1850s. The community's isolation lessened in 1871 with the opening of the Mount Pleasant and Broadford Railroad, later part of the Baltimore and Ohio Railroad. In addition, a branch line of the Pennsylvania Railroad connected the borough to Scottdale, and West Penn Railways (an interurban trolley) served Mount Pleasant from 1906 to 1952.

The Borough of Mount Pleasant has three listings on the National Register of Historic Places: the Samuel Warden House (1886) at 200 South Church Street, the demolished Mount Pleasant Armory, and the Mount Pleasant Historic District, which encompasses the oldest parts of the borough.

Geography
Mount Pleasant is located at  (40.149847, -79.542609).

According to the United States Census Bureau, the borough has a total area of 1.1 square miles (3.0 km2), all  land.

Demographics

As of the census of 2000, there were 4,728 people, 2,057 households, and 1,225 families residing in the borough. The population density was 4,127.5 people per square mile (1,587.4/km2). There were 2,227 housing units at an average density of 1,944.1 per square mile (747.7/km2). The racial makeup of the borough was 97.10% White, 1.67% African American, 0.15% Native American, 0.23% Asian, 0.15% from other races, and 0.70% from two or more races. Hispanic or Latino of any race were 0.32% of the population.

A large proportion of the residents are of Polish descent, as evidenced by the Tadeusz Kościuszko Club.

There were 2,057 households, out of which 22.9% had children under the age of 18 living with them, 45.7% were married couples living together, 10.6% had a female householder with no husband present, and 40.4% were non-families. 36.6% of all households were made up of individuals, and 20.4% had someone living alone who was 65 years of age or older. The average household size was 2.20 and the average family size was 2.88.

In the borough the population was spread out, with 19.1% under the age of 18, 6.3% from 18 to 24, 26.5% from 25 to 44, 22.9% from 45 to 64, and 25.2% who were 65 years of age or older. The median age was 44 years. For every 100 females, there were 83.5 males. For every 100 females age 18 and over, there were 80.2 males.

The median income for a household in the borough was $30,738, and the median income for a family was $41,438. Males had a median income of $30,655 versus $23,333 for females. The per capita income for the borough was $16,517. About 5.1% of families and 11.0% of the population were below the poverty line, including 14.9% of those under age 18 and 9.0% of those age 65 or over.

Notable people
 Jennifer Daugherty (November 8, 1979 – February 11, 2010), mentally disabled woman who was tortured and killed as an act of revenge.
Jack Gantos (born 1951), author of children's books
 John W. Geary (1819–1873), U.S. general during the Civil War
 Lillian Resler Keister Harford (1851–1935), church organizer and editor
 Raymond V. Kirk (1901–1947), president of Duquesne University
 Rich Rollins (born 1938), Major League Baseball player
 Jess M. Stairs (born 1942), Republican Party member of the Pennsylvania House of Representatives
 Steve Swetonic (1903–1974), Major League Baseball pitcher

References

External links

 Borough of Mount Pleasant (Official Site)
 Mt. Pleasant Glass and Ethnic Festival

Boroughs in Westmoreland County, Pennsylvania
Populated places established in 1797
Pittsburgh metropolitan area
1828 establishments in Pennsylvania